Otto Ackermann may refer to:
 Otto Ackermann (painter) (1872–1953), German painter
 Otto Ackermann (conductor) (1909–1960), Romanian conductor

See also
Ackermann (surname)